The 118th Wing (118 WG) is a unit of the Tennessee Air National Guard, stationed at Joint Base Berry Field, formerly Berry Field Air National Guard Base, Nashville, Tennessee. The 118th is equipped with the MQ-9 Reaper. If activated to federal service, it is gained by the United States Air Force Air Combat Command.

The 105th Tactical Airlift Squadron, assigned to the Wings 118th Operations Group, is a descendant organization of the World War I 105th Aero Squadron, established on 27 August 1917. It was reformed on 4 December 1921, as the 105th Observation Squadron, and is one of the 29 original National Guard Observation Squadrons of the United States Army National Guard formed before World War II.

Overview
The 118th Wing MQ-9 Reaper Remotely Piloted Aircraft (RPA) mission is to provide close air support (CAS), air interdiction, intelligence, surveillance and reconnaissance (ISR), and attack to eliminate threats when present. The multi-role capabilities of these RPAs allows Combat Search and Rescue operations and extended time over targets to locate, track, target, strike, and assess time sensitive targets

The plan also calls for the 118th Wing to get a cyber-security unit and expand their intelligence squadron.

Units
 118th Operations Group
 105th Attack Squadron - (MQ-9 Reaper) 
 118th Mission Support Group
 118th Intelligence Surveillance and Reconnaissance Group
 218th Intelligence Surveillance and Reconnaissance Group 
 118th Medical Group

History
 See 356th Fighter Group for additional lineage and history information

World War II
Established  on 8 December 1942 at Westover Field, Massachusetts as the 356th Fighter Group, equipped with P-47 Thunderbolts. Deployed to the European Theater of Operations (ETO), and assigned to Eighth Air Force in England.  Engaged in combat operations until May 1945. Returned to the United States during September–November 1945, and was inactivated on 10 November 1945.

Tennessee Air National Guard

Was re-established in 1946 as the Tennessee Air National Guard 118th Fighter Group, receiving federal recognition and being activated on 2 October 1947.  Formed at Berry Field, Nashville.  The new Group was initially assigned to the 54th Fighter Wing, Fourteenth Air Force.   It consisted of the 105th Fighter Squadron and the 155th Fighter Squadron at Memphis Municipal Airport.  Both squadrons flew the F-47 Thunderbolt.   In October 1947, the 154th Fighter Squadron at Little Rock, Arkansas (Arkansas ANG), was assigned to the Group.  The 154th flew F-51 Mustangs.

On 1 September 1950, the group was elevated to a Wing level and was activated as the 118th Composite Wing. It was assigned to Fourteenth Air Force, Continental Air Command, with Wing Headquarters at Berry Field. The 118th Fighter Group was redesignated the 118th Composite Group and along with the 105th Fighter Squadron was absorbed by the 118th Composite Wing.  On 1 February 1951, the 118th Composite Wing, 118th Composite Group and 105th Fighter Squadron were redesignated the 118th Tactical Reconnaissance Wing, Group and Squadron respectively.

The 118th Tactical Reconnaissance Wing (TRW) and Group were activated for federal service 1 February 1951. On 13 April 1951, the 118th TRW was reassigned to Tactical Air Command, (TAC), Langley AFB, Virginia, and operated from the municipal airport at Memphis, TN. On 3 August 1951, the 118th TRW was released from assignment to TAC and reassigned and transferred to Headquarters Ninth Air Force, Shaw AFB, SC. The 105th Tactical Reconnaissance Squadron stayed at Berry Field. It was redesignated as the 105th Fighter Interceptor Squadron and was activated in place 1 March 1951. While on active duty, it operated two geographically separated units; Detachment 1 flying P-47 Thunderbolt aircraft, from McGhee-Tyson Airport at Knoxville, TN, provided air defense for the Atomic Energy Commission at Oak Ridge, and Detachment 2 was the 4674th Ground Observer Squadron, Smyrna, TN.

1 January 1953, the 118th Tactical Reconnaissance Wing returned to Berry Field with the following assigned units: 118th Tactical Reconnaissance Group, 105th Tactical Reconnaissance Squadron, 155th Tactical Reconnaissance Squadron at Memphis, and the 154th Tactical Reconnaissance Squadron at Little Rock, AR. The units were equipped with the RF-51 Mustang from 1953 – 1954, the Lockheed RF-80C Shooting Star from 1954 – 1956, and the Republic RF-84F Thunderflash from 1956 to early 1961.

In April 1961 the Wing converted to an airlift mission flying the C-97G Stratofreighter.  On 12 May 1961, the 118th Air Transport Wing (Heavy) was reassigned to Eastern Transport Air Force (EASTAF), Military Air Transport Service (MATS). In January 1966, MATS was renamed Military Airlift Command (MAC). As a result, the 118th Air Transport Wing, Group and Squadron were redesignated the 118th Military Airlift Wing, Group and Squadron. The 118th MAW converted to the C-124C Globemaster II transport and received the first of eight of these aircraft 6 April 1967.

Operating from Nashville during the Vietnam War, the 118th MAW supported global airlift requirements of U.S. military forces. The Wing became Executive Agent for ANG Airlift Support in conjunction with the Vietnam effort in 1965. This function now resides at the Air National Guard Readiness Center at Andrews AFB, MD. A well-trained group of officers and airmen at Berry Field operating 24 hours a day, seven days a week, coordinated the airlift of equipment and personnel by 18 Military Airlift Groups in 15 states. Beginning in December 1965, the 105th MAS flew more than 100 missions to South Vietnam in a period of approximately a year and a half.

In March 1971, the Wing converted to the C-130A Hercules aircraft and became the 118th Tactical Airlift Wing. The Wing was assigned to Ninth Air Force, Tactical Air Command. Ultimately five ANG Tactical Airlift Groups were assigned to the Wing by 9 June 1973: the 145th TAG, Charlotte, NC, the 166th TAG, New Castle, DE, the 167th TAG Martinsburg, WV, the 170th TAG, McGuire AFB, NJ, and the 118th TAG at Nashville. 1 December 1974, the 118th Tactical Airlift Wing was transferred from 9th Air Force, Tactical Air Command (TAC), to 21st Air Force, Military Airlift Command (MAC). On 9 February 1975, the 118th Tactical Airlift Group was inactivated, passing its World War II lineage and history to the 118th Tactical Airlift Wing. In June 1978 the Wing was recognized for its achievements and was awarded the Air Force Outstanding Unit Award. In 1979, the Wing was enlarged from eight to sixteen C-130A Aircraft.

Since acquiring the C-130 airframe, the unit has supported a worldwide tactical airlift mission. Participation in exercises such as Brave Shield, Brim Frost and Red Flag were accomplished with some of the oldest aircraft in the inventory (1954–1957 A models). Rotations to Panama in support of Volant Oak beginning in 1977 became routine.

Post-Cold War
The Wing mobilized 462 personnel during 21 deployments for Operation Desert Shield and Operation Desert Storm in southwest Asia and flew a record 7239 flying hours.  In 1992, Military Airlift Command (MAC) was reorganized as the Air Mobility Command (AMC). As a part of this reorganization, the 118th Tactical Airlift Wing became the 118th Airlift Wing. With sixteen C-130H aircraft and 1406 personnel at Nashville, the 118th Airlift Wing was one of the largest flying units in the Air National Guard at that time.

Following 11 September 2001, the operational tempo increased. Over one-third of the Wing was activated for one year or more to supporting the National Homeland Security Plan (Operation Noble Eagle), which included deploying aircraft and personnel to bases inside the United States for several months, then assigned a home station alert mission. Shortly after the Wing completed the Noble Eagle mission, the Wing was selected to deploy to Southwest Asia in support CENTCOM Operations.

Operation Enduring Freedom/Operation Iraqi Freedom
In 2003, the 118th deployed ten C-130’s and over 320 personnel to the Middle East in direct support of combat operations at the beginning of Operation Iraqi Freedom. While living in austere conditions in tents, enduring the desert heat and sand storms, the men and women of the 118th supported combat operations into and out of Baghdad and surrounding areas of Iraq. The 118th was the lead wing in establishing a bare base in support of the largest contingent of C-130’s ever based in a combat environment, over 46 C-130’s located at a single base. The unit supported CENTCOM at various locations in Iraq, Kuwait, Oman and Saudi Arabia. The unit returned home at different times in late 2003 as U.S. forces were drawn down and rotated to meet the changing requirements. In late 2003, the Wing again deployed to Uzbekistan supporting Operating Enduring Freedom in Afghanistan.

BRAC 2005 and the C-130 International Training Center

As part of BRAC 2005, the Department of Defense was recommended to realign Berry Field Air National Guard Base. This recommendation would distribute the C-130H aircraft of the 118th Airlift Wing to the 182d Airlift Wing of the Illinois Air National Guard at Greater Peoria Airport Air National Guard Station, IL (four aircraft), and the 123d Airlift Wing of the Kentucky Air National Guard at Louisville IAP Air National Guard Station, KY (four aircraft). Flying related ECS (aerial port and fire fighters) would move to Memphis Air National Guard Base and the aeromedical squadron from Nashville would move to NAS JRB Fort Worth, TX. Other ECS would remain in place at Nashville. Nashville had a low military value ranking and was near other ANG bases keeping or gaining aircraft.

In October 2007, it was announced that as an amendment to the BRAC 2005 decision, the 118 AW would continue to retain a flying mission, transitioning from an Air Mobility Command (AMC)-gained unit to that of a training organization operationally gained by the Air Education and Training Command (AETC). As the C-130 International Training Center, the 118 AW assumed a new role in support of DoD Foreign Military Sales (FMS), training up to 150 international military C-130E and C-130H flight crew and maintenance students annually. Although its C-130H2 aircraft were transferred to other Air National Guard airlift wings, the 118 AW did gain six WC-130H aircraft that had been retired from weather reconnaissance duties with the Air Force Reserve Command's 403d Wing at Keesler AFB, Mississippi. The first class of international C-130 students (from Poland) trained by the 118 AW graduated in October 2008.

Shortly after transitioning to the C-130 International Training Center, the 118th Airlift Wing was again reorganized as the 118th Wing. The 118th is now tasked with supporting global unmanned aircraft intelligence, surveillance, and reconnaissance operations. The wing converted to MQ-9 Reaper Remotely Piloted Aircraft (RPA) during 2012.

Lineage
 Constituted as 356th Fighter Group on 8 December 1942
 Activated on 12 December 1942
 Inactivated on 10 November 1945
 Re-designated 118th Fighter Group and allotted to Tennessee ANG on 24 May 1946
 Extended federal recognition on 2 October 1947
 Re-designated: 118th Composite Group in Nov 1950
 Re-designated: 118th Tactical Reconnaissance Group in Feb 1951
 Ordered to active duty on 1 April 1951
 Relieved from active service and returned, without personnel and equipment, Tennessee state control, 1 January 1953
 Re-designated: 118th Air Transport Group, 1 April 1961
 Re-designated: 118th Military Airlift Group, 8 January 1966
 Re-designated: 118th Tactical Airlift Group, 1 March 1971
 Status changed from Group to Wing, 9 February 1975
 Re-designated: 118th Tactical Airlift Wing, 9 February 1975
 Re-designated: 118th Airlift Wing, 1 January 1993
 Re-designated: 118th Wing, 1 September 2012

Assignments
 I Fighter Command, 12 December 1942
 Attached to: New York Fighter Wing 30 May – 4 July 1943
 Attached to: Boston Fighter Wing 4 July – 15 August 1943
 65th Fighter Wing, 26 August 1943
 67th Fighter Wing, 8 August 1944
 Attached to: 1st Bombardment (later Air) Division, 15 September 1944 – 2 November 1945
 Army Service Forces, 9–10 November 1945
 54th Fighter Wing, 2 October 1947
 Tennessee Air National Guard, 11 October 1950
 Gained by: Tenth Air Force, Continental Air Command
 Gained by: Tactical Air Command, 1 April 1951
 363d Tactical Reconnaissance Wing, 15 January 1952
 Tennessee Air National Guard, 1 January 1953
 Gained by: Tactical Air Command
 Gained by: Eastern Transport Air Force, (EASTAF), Military Air Transport Service, 1 April 1961
 Gained by: Twenty-First Air Force, Military Airlift Command, 8 January 1966
 Gained by: Tactical Air Command, 1 March 1971
 Gained by: Military Airlift Command, 1 December 1973
 Gained by: Air Mobility Command, 1 June 1992
 Gained by: Air Education and Training Command, 1 June 2007 – September 2012
 Gained by: Air Combat Command, September 2012

Components
 118th Operations Group, 1 January 1993 – Present
 145th Tactical Airlift (later Airlift) Group, 15 May 1971 – 1 October 1995 (GSU at Charlotte, NC)
 164th Air Transport (later Military Airlift, Tactical Airlift, Airlift) Group, 1 April 1961 – 1 October 1995 (GSU at Memphis TN)
 166th Tactical Airlift (later Airlift) Group, 12 May 1971 – 10 January 1995 (GSU at New Castle, DE)
 167th Tactical Airlift (later Airlift) Group, 1 July 1972 – 1 October 1995, (GSU at Martinsburg, WV)
 170th Tactical Airlift Group, 1 July 1973 – 1 April 1977, (GSU at McGuire AFB, NJ)
 105th Fighter (later Tactical Reconnaissance, Air Transport, Military Airlift, Tactical Airlift, Airlift) Squadron, 3 February 1947 – 1 September 1950; 1 December 1952 – Present
 154th Tactical Reconnaissance Squadron, 2 October 1947 – 10 October 1950; 10 July 1952 – 1 April 1961; attached: 1 April 1961 – 1 October 1962 (GSU at Little Rock AFB, AR)
 155th Tactical Reconnaissance Squadron, 3 February 1947 – 31 March 1961 (GSU at Memphis MAP, TN)
 236th Intelligence Squadron, 2009–Present
 359th Fighter Squadron, 12 December 1942 – 10 November 1945
 360th Fighter Squadron, 12 December 1942 – 10 November 1945
 361st Fighter Squadron, 12 December 1942 – 10 November 1945

Stations

 Westover Field, Massachusetts, 12 December 1942
 Groton Army Airfield, Connecticut, 11 March 1943
 Mitchel Field, New York, 30 May 1943
 Grenier Field, New Hampshire, 4 Jul-19 Aug 1943
 RAF Goxhill (AAF-345), England, 26 August 1943
 RAF Martlesham Heath (AAF-359), England, 12 Oct 1943 – 4 Nov 1945

 Camp Kilmer, New Jersey, 9–10 Nov 1945
 Berry Field, Nashville, Tennessee, 2 October 1947
 Operated From: Memphis Municipal Airport, Tennessee, 12 April 1951 – 15 January 1952
 Operated from: Shaw Air Force Base, South Carolina, 15 January 1952 – 1 January 1953
 Designated: Berry Field Air National Guard Base, 1991–Present

Aircraft

 P-47D Thunderbolt, 1943–1944
 P-51D Mustang, 1944–1945
 F-51D Mustang, 1953–1955
 RF-80A Shooting Star, 1954–1956
 RF-84F Thunderflash, 1956–1961

 C-97G Stratofreighter, 1961–1967
 C-124C Globemaster II, 1967–1971
 C-130A Hercules, 1971–1990
 C-130H Hercules, 1990–2008
 WC-130H Hercules, 2008–2012
 MQ-9 Reaper, 2012–Present

Operations and decorations
 Combat Operations: World War II
 Campaigns:

 Air Offensive, Europe
 Normandy
 Northern France
 Rhineland
 Ardennes-Alsace
 Central Europe
 Operation Volant & Operation Coronet Oak- airlift support for SOUTHCOM in Central & South America
 Operation Brim Frost – airlift support to Alaska in 1985, 1987, 1989
 Operation Arctic Warrior – airlift support to Alaska, early 1990s
 Operation Amalgam Warrior – airlift support to Alaska, late 1990s
 Operation Amalgam Virgo – airlift support to Alaska, late 1990s
 Operation Creek Resolve – airlift support in Turkey
 Operation Desert Shield & Operation Desert Storm – deployments of Forces in support of CENTCOM in Southwest Asia

 Operation Distant Haven – humanitarian operations for Haitian refugees in Suriname
 Operation Provide Relief – humanitarian airlift into Somalia
 Operation Provide Promise – airlift into Sarajevo and airdrops over Bosnia
 Operation Support Hope – humanitarian operations in or near Rwanda
 Operation Uphold Democracy – supporting military forces in Haiti
 Operation Southern Watch – enforcing the no-fly zone over southern Iraq
 Operation Joint Guard – supporting peacekeeping operations in Yugoslavia
 Operation Joint Endeavor – supporting peacekeeping operations in Bosnia
 Operation Noble Eagle – supporting the National Homeland Security Plan
 Operation Enduring Freedom – deployment of forces in support of CENTCOM
 Operation Iraqi Freedom – deployment of forces in support of CENTCOM operations in Iraq

 Decorations:
 Distinguished Unit Citation: Holland, 17, 18, and 23 September 1944.
 Air Force Outstanding Unit Award

References

 118th Airlift Wing history page
 118th Airlift Wing@globalsecurity.org
 Rogers, B. (2006). United States Air Force Unit Designations Since 1978. 
 Maurer, Maurer, Air Force Combat Units of World War II, Office of Air Force history (1961).

External links
 
 
 GlobalSecurity.org – 118th AW
 Tennessee Air National Guard

Wings of the United States Air National Guard
Military units and formations in Tennessee
0118